Bile acyl-CoA synthetase is an enzyme that in humans is encoded by the SLC27A5 gene.

The protein encoded by this gene is an isozyme of very long-chain acyl-CoA synthetase (VLCS). It is capable of activating very long-chain fatty-acids containing 24- and 26-carbons. It is expressed in liver and associated with endoplasmic reticulum but not with peroxisomes. Its primary role is in fatty acid elongation or complex lipid synthesis rather than in degradation. This gene has a mouse ortholog.

See also 
 Solute carrier family

References

Further reading

Solute carrier family